The Yugoslav Film Archive is a film archive located in Belgrade, the capital of Serbia. Founded in 1949, it is a founding member of the International Federation of Film Archives and was the national film library of the Yugoslavia and currently of Serbia. The main cinema operated by the Yugoslav Film Archive is named after Dušan Makavejev.

History 
The Yugoslav Film Archive was founded by the Federal People's Republic of Yugoslavia's Committee for Cinema in 1949. 

During the 1999 NATO bombing of Yugoslavia the archive's collection was under threat, however, it was successfully saved. Italian director Bernardo Bertolucci penned a plea for the Archive to be spared during the bombing.

After restoration, the new main building of the Archive was officially opened in 2011 and in 2014 it was opened for the public.

Collection 
The film collection contains over 100 000 film prints of various national productions, of all genres, silent and sound, black & white and color, both nitrate and acetate. Around 85% of the entire film collection consists of foreign film material, including some previously considered lost, which makes the archive particularly interesting for film archivists and researchers from all over the world.

The Yugoslav Film Fund saved the most important archive material and documentaries related to the territory of former Yugoslavia, starting from the oldest extant film in the country Coronation of King Peter the First from 1904 until its restoration in 1992. The collection of Yugoslav films includes more than 90% of production since the Second World War. Most of the films have a copy protection (two copies per title). The film collection is constantly increasing deposit of films made and the placed in the country, sharing with other film archives, and through purchase and gifts from individuals and institutions.

The archival photographic collection contains approximately 250,000 identified (and as much unprocessed) images from local or foreign film productions, portraits of film workers and other participants in the film industry. Collection of documents and written film material contains all types of documents, letters, contracts, original scripts and other material relevant to the history and study of national cinema.

The archival collection contains posters of films (domestic and foreign productions) and movie festivals. The Archive has processed about 15,000 posters and about 200,000 of unidentified and untreated material. Priority task is the protection of posters related to domestic films.

See also
 List of film archives
 Yugoslav Drama Theatre
 Museum of Yugoslavia
 Archives of Yugoslavia

References

External links

 
 Film school for revolutionists (article)

1949 establishments in Yugoslavia
Organizations established in 1949
Film archives in Europe
Film organizations in Serbia
Cinema of Yugoslavia
Culture in Belgrade
Organizations based in Belgrade
Archives in Serbia